Auchendinny (Scottish Gaelic: Achadh an t-Sionnaich, meaning field of the fox) is a small village in Glencorse near Penicuik, Midlothian, Scotland. The village had a paper mill at Dalmore, until its closure in 2005. This was Midlothian's last remaining papermill and after demolition is now the site of new home development. Nearby Auchendinny House was the last country house designed by gentleman architect Sir William Bruce.

Buildings of Note
Penicuik was the heart of the Scottish paper industry, and the nearby mill (the Brunt Mill) at Auchendinny was established in 1716.  
The mill was destroyed by fire in the 1840s.  It became a laundry in 1856, serving Queen Victoria during her residence at Holyroodhouse, and operated as such until the 1960s.

Auchendinny House was remodelled by Robert Lorimer in 1900.

Notables
Billy Purvis (1853), entertainer and showman
George Affleck, footballer for Grimsby Town and Leeds City

See also
Auchendinny railway station

References

External links

Vision of Britain - History of Auchendinny in Midlothian
GEN UKI - Parish of Glencorse
Scottish Places - Historical perspective for Parish of Glencorse

Villages in Midlothian
Penicuik